The Capilano Review (TCR) is a Canadian tri-annual literary magazine located and published in Vancouver, British Columbia, Canada on the traditional, ancestral, and unceded territory of the xʷməθkʷəy̓əm (Musqueam), Sḵwx̱wú7mesh (Squamish), and səl̓ilwətaɁɬ (Tsleil-Waututh). A member of the Canadian Magazine Publishers Association, Magazine Association of BC, and the Alliance for Arts and Culture, it publishes avant-garde experimental poetry, visual art, interviews, and essays. The magazine features works by emerging and established Canadian and international writers and artists.

The Capilano Review also publishes the web folio ti-TCR and the digital chapbook series SMALL CAPS. The magazine hosts an annual Writer-in-Residence, as well as regular readings, workshops, panels, and contests throughout the year.

History
The Capilano Review was founded in 1972 by Pierre Coupey at Capilano College. Since then, editors have included Bill Schermbrucker, Ann Rosenberg, Dorothy Jantzen, Bob Sherrin, Ryan Knighton, Sharon Thesen, Jenny Penberthy, Brook Houglum, Andrea Actis, Catriona Strang, Fenn Stewart, and Matea Kulić. In 2015, TCR parted from Capilano University and set up as an independent, non-profit magazine in Vancouver.

Notable contributors
Past collaborators include novelist Michael Ondaatje, artist and filmmaker Jack Chambers, artist Roy Kiyooka, architect Arthur Erickson, and poet bill bissett.
More recently, special issues have included works of Lisa Robertson, Daphne Marlatt, Eliot Weinberger, Rodrigo Toscano, and artist/photographers Marian Penner Bancroft, Christos Dikeakos, and Robert Keziere.

The Capilano Review's Writer-in-Residence Program has hosted Daphne Marlatt, bill bissett, Brian Fawcett, Lisa Robertson, Peter Quartermain, August Kleinzahler, Ingrid de Kok, Fred Wah, George Stanley, Tom Cone, Sharon Thesen, Barry McKinnon, Bhanu Kapil, Cole Swenson, Kevin Killian & Dodie Bellamy, Fred Moten, and Michelle Sylliboy.

Recognition
"The Capilano Review has, for over thirty years, provided a measure to the innovative and contemporary and a productive site for a generation of literary and artistic boundary walkers. Its editors have provoked and sustained the imagination and possibility for a wide range of writers and artists. The TCR is a crucial voice to the continuing surge of west coast and Canadian culture." - Fred Wah

The publication itself has, since 1978, received numerous awards: eight gold and silver awards for fiction and poetry from The National Magazine Foundation, one Journey Prize, two Western Magazine Awards, and one Association for Canadian Studies Award of Merit in recognition of contributions to the development of Canadian Studies.

TCR contributors have been included among the Griffin Poetry Prize nominees and winners – Christian Bök, George Bowering, Erín Moure, August Kleinzahler, Sylvia Legris, Robin Blaser, Ken Babstock, Roo Borson, Di Brandt, Robert Bringhurst, Nicole Brossard, Robert Majzels, David McFadden, Don McKay. The Dorothy Livesay Poetry Prize, one of the annual BC Book Prizes, has included amongst its nominees and winners several TCR contributors, such as George Bowering, Meredith Quartermain, Steve Collis, Ken Belford, Fred Wah, Larissa Lai, Daphne Marlatt, George Stanley, Sharon Thesen, Rita Wong, among others.

References

External links
 Official website

1972 establishments in British Columbia
Literary magazines published in Canada
Capilano University
Magazines established in 1972
Magazines published in British Columbia
Triannual magazines published in Canada